Dastjerd Rural District is a rural district (dehestan) in Khalajastan District, Qom County, Qom Province, Iran. At the 2006 census, its population was 4,153, in 1,411 families.  The rural district has 27 villages.

References 

Rural Districts of Qom Province
Qom County